Rubus lambertianus is a flowering plant species in the genus Rubus found in Southern China (including Hainan), Taiwan, Japan, and Thailand. Its ploidy is 2n = 4X (tetraploid). The ellagitannins lambertianin A, B, C and D can be found in R. lambertianus.

Description
In China, it occurs on slopes, roadsides, montane valleys, stony ravines, grasslands, thickets, sparse forests, and forest margins at elevations of  asl. In Taiwan it is common in thickets at medium elevations.

References

External links 

 
 

lambertianus
Plants described in 1825
Flora of China
Flora of Japan
Flora of Taiwan
Flora of Thailand